Stone Makers is a Canadian short documentary film, directed by Jean-Marc E. Roy and released in 2016. Created as part of the National Film Board of Canada's 5 Shorts Project, the film depicts workers at a quarry in Saguenay, Quebec, allowing the sound of the machines to create a sort of "industrial symphony".

The film was shot with a monochrome Digital Bolex.

The film was a shortlisted Canadian Screen Award finalist for Best Short Documentary Film at the 5th Canadian Screen Awards.

References

External links

Watch Stone Makers at the National Film Board of Canada

2016 films
Canadian short documentary films
National Film Board of Canada documentaries
Films shot in Quebec
Films directed by Jean-Marc E. Roy
2010s Canadian films
2016 short documentary films